is a railway station in the city of Handa, Aichi Prefecture, Japan, operated by Central Japan Railway Company (JR Tōkai).

Lines
Okkawa Station is served by the Taketoyo Line, and is located 12.8 kilometers from the starting point of the line at Ōbu Station.

Station layout
The station  has two opposed side platforms connected to the station building by a footbridge. The station has automated ticket machines, TOICA automated turnstiles and is unattended.

Platforms

Adjacent stations

|-
!colspan=5|Central Japan Railway Company

Station history
Okkawa Station opened on December 7, 1933, as a passenger station on the Japanese Government Railways (JGR). Freight operations commenced from April 1, 1944. The JGR became the Japanese National Railways (JNR) after World War II. Freight operations were discontinued from November 15, 1975. With the privatization and dissolution of JNR on April 1, 1987, the station came under the control of JR Central. The station building was rebuilt in March 2006. Automatic turnstiles were installed in May 1992, and the TOICA system of magnetic fare cards was implemented in November 2006.

Station numbering was introduced to the Taketoyo Line in March 2018; Okkawa Station was assigned station number CE06.

Passenger statistics
In fiscal 2018, the station was used by an average of 1178 passengers daily (boarding passengers only).

Surrounding area
Okkawa Elementary School
Okkawa Jinjal

See also
 List of Railway Stations in Japan

References

External links

Railway stations in Japan opened in 1933
Railway stations in Aichi Prefecture
Taketoyo Line
Stations of Central Japan Railway Company
Handa, Aichi